In forensic investigation, the time of occurrence of an event (such as time of death, time of incident) is one of the most important things to determine accurately as soon as possible. Sometimes this can only be estimated. Some indicators that investigators use are rigor mortis, livor mortis, algor mortis, clouding of the corneas, state of decomposition, presence/absence of purged fluids and level of tissue desiccation.

Pathologists can assume a time of death via analysing necrophagous diptera. The odour from decaying flesh attracts different species as the stages of decomposition progress.

References

External links
 Science Daily Retrieved 2013-12-02

Medical aspects of death
Forensic science
Law enforcement terminology